Drosera schizandra is a species of Drosera found in Queensland, Australia. Commonly called the notched sundew or heart-leaf sundew, it has round, oval leaves that sometimes develop notched tips as they grow, giving them a heartlike shape.

See also
List of Drosera species

References

External links

Carnivorous plants of Australia
Caryophyllales of Australia
schizandra
Flora of Queensland
Plants described in 1906
Vulnerable flora of Australia